Foxbase Alpha is the debut studio album by English band Saint Etienne, released on 16 September 1991 by Heavenly Recordings.

The album was recorded in a style which drew on the club culture and house music of the time, but also incorporates the group's characteristic love of 1960s pop, with tracks also bridged by samples from films or by short songs. At the time of recording, Sarah Cracknell was not fully part of the group, and as a result she does not sing on "Only Love Can Break Your Heart", which is sung by Moira Lambert.

Foxbase Alpha was on the short list of nominees for the 1992 Mercury Prize. It was accompanied by several successful singles, including "Nothing Can Stop Us". The album was also included in the book 1001 Albums You Must Hear Before You Die.

Songs
The album includes one of the group's best-known songs: a cover of Neil Young's "Only Love Can Break Your Heart". The cover quite differs from the original in that the original's mostly major chord progression is turned here into mostly minor, which emphasises a more melancholic feel. It is also arranged in 4/4 (as opposed to the original's waltz time), with a driving piano-bass-drum section. Andrew Weatherall later remixed the song to further emphasise the dub bassline; this remix was featured on both releases of the single and on the compilation Casino Classics (on American and European versions of the single, a Flowered Up remix is erroneously featured instead of the Andrew Weatherall mix). The follow-up single "Kiss and Make Up" was also a cover version, of a song written and originally recorded by The Field Mice. Ian Catt was the engineer/co-producer on both versions.

"Carnt Sleep" is based on the Youthman riddim, a backing track that reggae producer Glen Brown has used on dozens of records since the late 1970s. "Wilson" is based on a loop of the intro to Wilson Pickett's version of "Hey Jude" and spoken samples from a decimalisation training record. "Nothing Can Stop Us", one of the group's most famous singles, features a very prominent sample of Dusty Springfield's track, "I Can't Wait Until I See My Baby's Face" (from her 1967 album Where Am I Going?.) Saint Etienne later recorded a version of "Nothing Can Stop Us" with vocals by Kylie Minogue.

The dialogue heard in the track "Etienne Gonna Die" is from the movie House of Games.

Saint Etienne members have named OMD's Dazzle Ships as a prominent influence on the album.

Artwork
The young woman on the cover of Foxbase Alpha, Celina Nash, was a member of the group Golden alongside Lucy Gillie and Candida Richardson; they released two singles ("Anglo American"/"Don't Destroy Me" in 1992, and "Wishful Thinking", written by Jarvis Cocker, in 1993) on Bob Stanley and Pete Wiggs's Icerink Records label. Nash also appears in Saint Etienne's 1993 album So Tough; she is the waitress who can be heard on "Chicken Soup". She is also in the video for the Pulp song "Babies".

Releases

US edition
The US version of the album, released in January 1992, adds two bonus tracks: a new version of "Kiss and Make Up", rerecorded with Cracknell, and a unique version of "People Get Real", which was released as a double 'A' side single with "Join Our Club" later the same year.

2009 Deluxe Edition
The album was re-released in May 2009 as part of the Universal Music Deluxe Edition re-issue program. The album has been remastered, and is accompanied by a second disc featuring B-sides, mixes and five previously unreleased tracks. The CD booklet features new sleeve notes by Jon Savage and Tom Ewing, images and memorabilia.

Also released was a boxed-set version, which was limited to 1000 copies. In addition to the two CDs this package also included a 6" Subbuteo figure and a replica Foxbase Alpha poster, as well as a set of four badges.

Foxbase Beta
In 2009, Foxbase Alpha was 're-produced' and remixed from the original multi-tracks by Richard X. This new version was called Foxbase Beta, and formed the basis of much of what was played during the band's May 2009 tour, which saw Foxbase Alpha played live in its entirety for the first time. Foxbase Beta was packaged with an additional CD titled Foxbase Extra, featuring a commentary on the album by Bob Stanley, Pete Wiggs and Richard X, and additional out-takes. A single disc version was sold at their 2009 shows and through Rough Trade Records in London.

25th Anniversary Edition
Available for pre-order in 2016, the 25th Anniversary Edition shipped in 2017.  The set included the original album pressed on two 12" vinyl records, a second 12" vinyl record entitled Remains of the Day with additional tracks not previously available on vinyl, and a 7" single of Kiss and Make Up, featuring vocals by Moira Lambert.  In addition to this, the special edition included a 12"x12" book, download code for the entire album in MP3 format, as well as reproductions of promotional material from the original release.

Track listing

1991 releases

2009 release

Personnel 
The liner notes list the album's personnel as follows:

 Saint Etienne – producer
 Ian Catt – engineer (at Catt Music, Mitcham)
 Sarah Cracknell – vocals
 Bob Stanley – Roland Jupiter 4, Korg M1, tambourine
 Pete Wiggs – SCI Prophet 5, Emax sampler, bongos
 Ian Catt – guitars, keyboard programming
 Moira Lambert – vocals on "Only Love Can Break Your Heart"
 Harvey Williams – bass guitar on "Only Love Can Break Your Heart"
 Pete Heller –  additional programming on "Kiss and Make Up"
 Bo Savage, Gazareth Sweeney, Uncle Vibes, Billy Nasty – The Inspirational Choir
 Jeff Barrett – press
 Alan McGee – management
 Joe Dilworth – photography
 Anthony Sweeney – sleeve design
 Paul the Tailor – suits
 Andrew Wickham – spin bowler
 Jerry Jaffe – American psyche
 Kate Askey – long leg
 Martin Kelly – the cage
 Celina Nash – girl with sign
 John Savage – liner notes

B-sides

from "Only Love Can Break Your Heart"
 "Only Love Can Break Your Heart (Version)"
 "Only Love Can Break Your Heart (A Mix of Two Halves)" (Remixed by Andrew Weatherall)
 "The Official Saint Etienne World Cup Theme"

from "Kiss and Make Up"
 "Sky's Dead" (7-inch version)
 "Kiss and Make Up (Extended Version)"
 "Sky's Dead"
 "Kiss and Make Up (Midsummer Madness Mix)" (Remixed by Pete Heller)
 "Kiss and Make (Midsummer Dubness Mix)" (Remixed by Pete Heller)

from "Nothing Can Stop Us" / "Speedwell"
 "Speedwell"
 "Speedwell (Flying Mix)" (Remixed by Dean Thatcher and Jagz)
 "Speedwell (Project Mix)" (Remixed by Dean Thatcher and Jagz)
 "Nothing Can Stop Us (Instrumental)"
 "3D Tiger"
 "Nothing Can Stop Us (Single Remix)" (Remixed by Masters at Work)
 "Nothing Can Stop Us (12" Remix)" (Remixed by Masters at Work)
 "Nothing Can Stop Us (House Mix)" (Remixed by Masters at Work)
 "Nothing Can Stop Us (Ken/Lou Dub)" (Remixed by Masters at Work)
 "Nothing Can Stop Us (Masters at Work Dub)"

from "Only Love Can Break Your Heart" (re-release)
 "Filthy"
 "Only Love Can Break Your Heart (Single Remix)"
 "Only Love Can Break Your Heart (KenLou B–Boy Mix)" (Remixed by Masters at Work)
 "Stoned to Say the Least (Album Version)"
 "Only Love Can Break Your Heart (Flowered Up Remix)"
 "Only Love Can Break Your Heart (Masters at Work Dub)"
 "Only Love Can Break Your Heart (Single-Album Version)"

Charts

References

1991 debut albums
Saint Etienne (band) albums
Heavenly Recordings albums
Warner Records albums
Trip hop albums by English artists